Jaime Darío Arrascaita Iriondo (born 2 September 1993) is a Bolivian footballer who plays as a midfielder for The Strongest in Bolivian Primera División.

Club career
Arrascaita was recruited in 2010 by Bolívar to be part of their lower divisions. In 2011 passed the reservations team of the club, the Professional Bolívar, with which participates in several regional, national and international championships as the Dallas Cup 2011 and 2012. At the beginning of the 2013-2014 season is promoted to the first team the club with which he first division debut in 2013 with 19 years, under the technical leadership of Miguel Ángel Portugal.

International career
He played for Bolivia national football team at the 2014 FIFA World Cup qualification.

International goals

References

External links

1993 births
Living people
Footballers from La Paz
Association football midfielders
Bolivian footballers
Bolivia international footballers
Club Bolívar players
Sport Boys Warnes players
Club Real Potosí players
C.D. Jorge Wilstermann players
The Strongest players